Jonas Persson is a Swedish businessman who is the former chairman of the Swedish association football club Kalmar FF, a post he held from February 2018 to February 2020. He is the CEO of Commercial Sports Media, a Swedish broadcasting rights company; he also serves on the board of Sportway. Sportway offers video streaming of youth sports events.

References

Year of birth missing (living people)
Living people
Kalmar FF